Hicham Aâboubou (born 19 May 1978) is a Moroccan professional footballer who last played as a defender for FC Lanaudière in the Première Ligue de soccer du Québec.

Career

Africa
Aâboubou started his soccer career with Khenifra playing with the junior team from 1992 to 1994. In 1994, he joined Kawkab Marrakech, initially playing with the junior team, before eventually graduating through the senior A team, where he would play until 2001. He played for Mouloudia Oujda, in 2001-2002, before being transferred back to Kawkab Marrakech. From 2002 to 2006 he played with KACM A Team, scoring two goals in 48 games.

North America
In 2006 Aâboubou joined Canadian team Laval Dynamites, and scored two goals in 13 games in his debut season with the club. On July 31 he joined Montreal Impact, but did not play a single game in his first year. He made his debut for the team on April 21, 2007 against the Atlanta Silverbacks, but was released by Montreal in February 2008. During the 2007 season he was loaned to the Impact's farm team Trois-Rivières Attak of the Canadian Soccer League. He managed to win some silverware with the Attak by winning the Open Canada Cup, where he featured in the finals match against Columbus Clan F.C. which resulted in a 3-0 victory.

In the summer of 2008 Aâboubou announced he would take a sabbatical from professional soccer, intending to return to study at Arts of Science at Université de Montréal while playing college soccer for the university's Montréal Carabins.

On July 28, 2009 the Montreal Impact signed Aâboubou to a two-year contract. He made his first appearance of the season on August 1 against Miami FC. During the 2009 season Aâboubou helped the Impact clinch a playoff spot by finishing fifth in the standings. In the playoffs, he helped the Impact reach the USL finals against the Vancouver Whitecaps FC, the match was noted for the first time in USL history where the final match would consist of two Canadian clubs. The Impact would eventually defeat the Whitecaps on 6-3 aggregate on goals, and therefore claim their third USL Championship.

Honors
Trois-Rivières Attak
 Open Canada Cup: 2007

References

External links
Montreal Impact bio

1978 births
Living people
Canadian Soccer League (1998–present) players
Expatriate soccer players in Canada
Laval Dynamites players
Moroccan footballers
Montreal Impact (1992–2011) players
Moroccan expatriate footballers
Moroccan expatriate sportspeople in Canada
Trois-Rivières Attak players
USL First Division players
USSF Division 2 Professional League players
North American Soccer League players
MC Oujda players
Association football defenders
People from Khenifra
Kawkab Marrakech players
Moroccan emigrants to Canada
Première ligue de soccer du Québec players
20th-century Moroccan people
21st-century Moroccan people
FC Lanaudière players